The State Compensation Insurance Fund (State Fund) is a workers' compensation insurer that was created as a "public enterprise fund" by the U.S. state of California, and today has partial autonomy from the rest of the state government.  It is required by state law to maintain its headquarters in San Francisco, but has regional offices all over the state.

State Fund was created by the Boynton Act of 1913, and it started operations in 1914.  Around that same time, the voters amended the California Constitution by initiative to strengthen the constitutionality of the state workers' compensation system.  This was necessary because American employers during the early 20th century often challenged mandatory workers' compensation statutes as an unconstitutional invasion of freedom of contract, an argument which had strong persuasive force during the Lochner era.  Since 1976, State Fund's constitutional basis has been found in Article 14, Section 4 of the state constitution:

In May 2014, State Fund reported 2013 assets of approximately $20 billion and a workforce of more than 4,000 people (the number varies based on State Fund's current percentage of the market). In 2013, State Fund’s market share was the largest in the state at nearly 11%. Its market share spiked to over 50 percent in years 2002–2004 when a large number of private carriers left the market. In keeping with its mission, State Fund has an open-door policy, writing insurance for California businesses that need workers' compensation insurance. State Fund insures approximately 130,000 policyholders in California. State Fund also serves as a third-party administrator, adjusting claims for almost all of the state agencies.

California is one of 21 states with a competitive state fund in the workers' compensation insurance market.

In 2010, State Fund implemented a plan to redesign operations and reduce costs for California employers. In 2013, State Fund announced that it reduced annual fixed expenses by $300 million. These savings will help State Fund maintain fair pricing and bring greater value to more California employers.

Notes

External links
 
 California Workers' Compensation Claims & Benefits @ WorkCompAcademy.com
 What Is the State Compensation Insurance Fund

Workers' compensation
Companies based in San Francisco